Inside Dope is a 1995 Ned Kelly Award-winning novel by the New Zealand author Paul Thomas.

Awards

Ned Kelly Awards for Crime Writing, Best Novel, 1996: joint winner

Dedication

"Dedication: To Jeni, and to my mother and father."

Notes

 This is the prequel to the author's follow-up, Guerilla Season.

1995 novels
20th-century New Zealand novels
Novels by Paul Thomas
Ned Kelly Award-winning works